Build automation is the process of automating the creation of a software build and the associated processes including: compiling computer source code into binary code, packaging binary code, and running automated tests.

Overview
Historically, build automation was accomplished through makefiles. Today, there are two general categories of tools:
Build-automation utility This includes utilities like Make, Rake, CMake, MSBuild, Ant, Maven or Gradle (Java) etc. Their primary purpose is to generate build artifacts through activities like compiling and linking source code.
Build-automation servers These are general web based tools that execute build-automation utilities on a scheduled or triggered basis; a continuous integration server is a type of build-automation server.

Depending on the level of automation the following classification is possible:
Makefile - level
 Make-based tools
 Non-Make-based tools
 Build script (or Makefile) generation tools
 Continuous-integration tools
 Configuration-management tools
 Meta-build tools or package managers
 Other
A software list for each can be found in list of build automation software.

Build-automation utilities
Build-automation utilities allow the automation of simple, repeatable tasks. When using the tool, it will calculate how to reach the goal by executing tasks in the correct, specific order and running each task. The two ways build tools differ are task-oriented vs. product-oriented. Task-oriented tools describe the dependency of networks in terms of a specific set task and product-oriented tools describe things in terms of the products they generate.

Build-automation servers
Although build servers existed long before continuous-integration servers, they are generally synonymous with continuous-integration servers, however a build server may also be incorporated into an ARA tool or ALM tool.

Server types
 On-demand automation such as a user running a script at the command line
 Scheduled automation such as a continuous integration server running a nightly build
 Triggered automation such as a continuous integration server running a build on every commit to a version-control system.

Distributed build automation
Automation is achieved through the use of a compile farm for either distributed compilation or the execution of the utility step. The distributed build process must have machine intelligence to understand the source-code dependencies to execute the distributed build.

Relationship to continuous delivery and continuous integration
Build automation is considered the first step in moving toward implementing a culture of continuous delivery and DevOps. Build automation combined with continuous integration, deployment, application-release automation, and many other processes help move an organization forward in establishing software-delivery best practices.

Advantages
The advantages of build automation to software development projects include
 A necessary pre-condition for continuous integration and continuous testing
 Improve product quality
 Accelerate the compile and link processing
 Eliminate redundant tasks
 Minimize "bad builds"
 Eliminate dependencies on key personnel
 Have history of builds and releases in order to investigate issues
 Save time and money - because of the reasons listed above.

See also

References

 
Types of tools used in software development